Mourad Mghizrat (born 7 September 1974) is a Moroccan former professional footballer who played as a forward. He is currently assistant coach at Quick Boys.

Club career
Mghizrat started his career with TONEGIDO, ONA and GC&FC Olympia, before moving to the academy of Sparta Rotterdam. He moved to the professional first team in 1996, making his senior debut on 31 May 1997 as a second-half substitute for Gregg Berhalter in a 1–3 home loss to RKC Waalwijk. In the 1998–99 season he was loaned to Utrecht. In January 2000, he signed for relegation candidate Den Bosch on loan. In that season he could not keep Den Bosch in the Eredivisie. In his second season at Den Bosch he promoted with the club. When Wiljan Vloet was trainer, Mghizrat played a strong season with fellow striker Bart Van Den Eede. In spite of his strong season, Den Bosch were relegated again, this time through play-offs.

After Den Bosch's relegation Mghizrat signed a three-year contract with Willem II. He played most of the matches the first season, but in his second season he only played two matches for Willem II. He had two loan spells, at FC Emmen in the 2003–04 season and again at Den Bosch in the 2004–05 season, before signing permanently with Emmen in 2005. By scoring 29 goals in 63 matches he appeared as an effective goal scorer, however the club did not want to extend his contract.

In 2007, he was close to sign a contract with Austrian Football First League club DSV Leoben. Financial problems, however, made the transfer impossible. Instead, he would move to Dutch amateur club Haaglandia in Rijswijk.

International career
Mghizrat gained one international cap for Morocco, as a substitute in a 3–0 friendly win over Togo on 26 November 1997.

Coaching career
In June 2016, he became assistant manager at amateur club Westlandia. He also worked with youths at his former club Sparta Rotterdam.

In April 2020, Mghizrat was appointed the new assistant manager at Quick Boys to head coach Edwin Grünholz.

References

External links

1974 births
Living people
People from Fez, Morocco
Association football forwards
Moroccan footballers
Morocco international footballers
Moroccan emigrants to the Netherlands
Eredivisie players
Eerste Divisie players
VSV TONEGIDO players
Sparta Rotterdam players
FC Emmen players
FC Den Bosch players
Willem II (football club) players
FC Utrecht players
Haaglandia players
RKVV Westlandia players